Maria Maddalena of Austria (7 October 1589 – 1 November 1631) was Grand Duchess of Tuscany by her marriage to Cosimo II in 1609 until his death in 1621. With him, she had eight children, including a duchess of Parma, a grand duke of Tuscany, and an archduchess of Further Austria. Born in Graz, Maria Magdalena was the youngest daughter of Charles II, Archduke of Inner Austria, and his wife Maria Anna of Bavaria. During the minority of her son, Grand Duke Ferdinando, she and her mother-in-law acted as regents from 1621 to 1628. She died on 1 November 1631 in Passau.

Grand Duchess consort of Tuscany
In 1608, the 19-year-old Maria Magdalena was married to Cosimo de' Medici, Grand Prince of Tuscany. Cosimo's father, Grand Duke Ferdinando I of Tuscany, arranged the marriage in order to assuage Spain's (where Maria Magdalena's sister was the incumbent queen) animosity towards Tuscany, which had been inflamed due to a string of Franco-Tuscan marriages. From then on, she was known as Maria Maddalena, the Italian form of her name.

Regency
She and Cosimo enjoyed a contented marriage. Together they had eight children in just eight years. Cosimo II died in 1621, leaving their ten-year-old son Ferdinando as grand duke. Maria Maddalena and her mother-in-law, Christina of Lorraine, acted as regents until the boy came of age. Their collective regency is known as the Turtici. Maria Maddalena's temperament was analogous to Christina's. Together, they aligned Tuscany with the Papacy; re-doubled the Tuscan clergy; and allowed the trial of Galileo Galilei to occur. Upon the death of the last Duke of Urbino, instead of claiming the duchy for Ferdinando, who was married to the Duke's granddaughter, and heiress, Vittoria della Rovere, they permitted it to be annexed by Pope Urban VIII. In 1626, they banned any Tuscan subject from being educated outside the Grand Duchy, a law later resurrected by Maria Maddalena's grandson, Cosimo III. Harold Acton ascribes the decline of Tuscany to their regency. The Dowager Grand Duchesses sent Ferdinando on a tour of Europe in 1627.

The Grand Duchess died aged 42 after a visit to her brother Leopold in Innsbruck on the way back to Passau, Germany. Her son had been in power for a year.

Issue
Maria Cristina de' Medici (August 24, 1609 – August 9, 1632), she was deformed or mentally disabled  
Ferdinando II de' Medici, Grand Duke of Tuscany (July 14, 1610 – May 23, 1670) married Vittoria della Rovere.
Gian Carlo de' Medici (July 24, 1611 – January 23, 1663) made Cardinal in 1644.
Margherita de' Medici (May 31, 1612 – February 6, 1679) married Odoardo Farnese, Duke of Parma.
Mattias de' Medici (May 9, 1613 – October 14, 1667) appointed Governor of Siena.
Francesco de' Medici (October 16, 1614 – July 25, 1634).
Anna de' Medici (July 21, 1616 – September 11, 1676) married Ferdinand Charles, Archduke of Austria (1628–1662)
Leopoldo de' Medici (November 6, 1617 – November 10, 1675), made Cardinal in 1667.

Ancestors

Citations

Bibliography
Acton, Harold: The Last Medici, Macmillan, London, 1980, 
Strathern, Paul: The Medici: Godfathers of the Renaissance, Vintage books, London, 2003, 
Hale, J.R.: Florence and the Medici, Orion books, London, 1977, 

17th-century House of Habsburg
Regents of Tuscany
House of Medici
1589 births
1631 deaths
17th-century German people
Grand Duchesses of Tuscany
17th-century women rulers
Burials at San Lorenzo, Florence
Daughters of monarchs